Ryszard Długosz (born 10 November 1941 in Nowotaniec) is a Polish former wrestler who competed in the 1968 Summer Olympics and in the 1972 Summer Olympics.

References

External links
 

1941 births
Living people
Olympic wrestlers of Poland
Wrestlers at the 1968 Summer Olympics
Wrestlers at the 1972 Summer Olympics
Polish male sport wrestlers
People from Sanok County
Sportspeople from Podkarpackie Voivodeship
20th-century Polish people
21st-century Polish people